Unit of Measure is an album by American guitarist Tony Rice, released in 2000. It is credited to The Tony Rice Unit.

Track listing 
 "Manzanita" (Tony Rice) – 3:53  
 "House of the Rising Sun" (Traditional) – 5:26  
 "Shenandoah" (Traditional) – 4:40  
 "Gold Rush" (Bill Monroe) – 3:02  
 "Jerusalem Ridge" (Monroe) – 6:38  
 "High Noon (Do Not Forsake Me)" (Dimitri Tiomkin, Ned Washington) – 3:44  
 "Beaumont Rag" (Traditional) – 3:37  
 "Swing '42" (Django Reinhardt) – 1:56  
 "An Olde Irish Aire (Danny Boy)" (Traditional) – 2:07  
 "Sally Goodin'" (Traditional) – 8:31

Personnel
Tony Rice – guitar
Wyatt Rice – guitar
Jimmy Gaudreau – mandolin
Rickie Simpkins – fiddle
Ronnie Simpkins – bass
Production notes:
Tony Rice – producer, engineer, song notes
Bill Wolf – producer, engineer, mixing, mastering, photography
Buck Parker – engineer, mixing, photography
Scott Alarik – liner notes

References

2000 compilation albums
Tony Rice compilation albums
Rounder Records compilation albums